Luis Ignacio Ubiña Olivera (7 June 1940 – 17 July 2013) was a Uruguayan football defender, who played for the Uruguay national team between 1965 and 1973. He was part of the Uruguay squad for the 1966 and 1970 world cups.

At clubs level, Ubiña played for Rampla Juniors and Nacional

References

External links
 
 

1940 births
2013 deaths
Footballers from Montevideo
Uruguayan footballers
Association football defenders
Uruguay international footballers
1966 FIFA World Cup players
1970 FIFA World Cup players
Uruguayan Primera División players
C.A. Cerro players
Rampla Juniors players
Club Nacional de Football players
Burials at Cementerio del Cerro, Montevideo